Voiutychi is a village (selo) in Sambir Raion, Lviv Oblast, in south-west Ukraine. Voiutychi belongs to Biskovychi rural hromada, one of the hromadas of Ukraine. 

The village was first mentioned in 1423.

References 

Villages in Sambir Raion